Imocetus is an extinct genus of ziphiid cetaceans, with one species, G. piscatus, from the Miocene of Portugal and Spain.
The etymology is after imum that means "ocean floor", and cetus that means "whale". Piscatus means "fished". The type specimen is at Museu da Lourinhã.

References

Miocene cetaceans
Ziphiids
Prehistoric cetacean genera
Fossil taxa described in 2013
Extinct mammals of Europe
Fossils of Portugal
Fossils of Spain